Dimitar Stoyanov may refer to:

Radoy Ralin (Dimitar Stoyanov, 1923–2004), Bulgarian dissident, poet and satirist
Dimitar Stoyanov (politician) (born 1983), Bulgarian and EU politician
Dimitar Stoyanov (actor) (born 1938), Bulgarian theatre director and actor
Dimitar Stoyanov (wrestler) (born 1931), Bulgarian Olympic wrestler
Dimitar Stoyanov (footballer), Bulgarian footballer
Dimitar Stoyanov (journalist) (born 1980), Bulgarian journalist